The Permissive Society is a 1975 BBC TV film, filmed as part of the Second City Firsts strand of short films set in Birmingham. It concerns a young couple (Les and Carol) facing difficulties with their relationship and sexual needs, whilst Les's sister Yvonne prepares for a date of her own.

Cast
 Bob Mason as Les
 Veronica Roberts as Carol, Les's girlfriend
 Rachel Davies as Yvonne, Les's sister

Plot
Before his date with Carol, Les brings her to his family's flat. His sister Yvonne arrives soon after, and the three engage in small talk, wherein Yvonne reveals that her husband left her and she has decided to try dating again. Les eventually rushes Yvonne off then he and Carol resume their awkward conversation, which nearly ends due to her impatience with him. She asks if he has treated previous girlfriends in such a manner, and he admits to her being his first. He has also never had sex, which explains him never making a pass at Carol. His stepfather's misinformation of sex has caused Les to remain a virgin.

Les apologises for his behaviour, as Carol looks around the flat, spying his ukulele. She asks him to play for her, and he sings "Leaning on a Lamp-post". She kisses him. Yvonne returns, after her date was a no-show. Les invites her to go out with them, but she declines. He and Carol leave her alone in the flat.

References

External links

1975 television films
1975 films
Films directed by Mike Leigh
British television films